Octavian was the name of Augustus (63 BC – 14 AD) before he became Emperor of Rome.

Octavian may also refer to:
 Octavian (horse), a British horse
 Octavian, an octopus villager from the video game series Animal Crossing
 Octavian (rapper), French-British rapper
 Octavian (romance), a 14th-century Middle English poem
 Octavians, financial commissioners in 16th century Scotland
 Octavian, a character in Der Rosenkavalier
 Octavian or Gus, a mouse in Cinderella
 Octavian, a Camp Half-Blood character
 Octavius, Latin praenomen (first name)

People with the given name
 Octavian Abrudan (born 1984), Romanian footballer
 Octavian Belu (born 1951), Romanian gymnastics coach
 Octavian Bodișteanu (born 1977), Moldovan politician
 Octavian Chihaia (born 1981), Romanian footballer
 Octavian Cotescu (1931–1985), Romanian actor
 Octavian Drăghici (born 1985), Romanian footballer
 Octavian Goga (1881–1938), Romanian politician, poet, and playwright
 Octavian Grigore (born 1964), Romanian footballer
 Octavian Guțu (born 1982), Moldovan swimmer
 Octavian Ionescu (footballer, born 1990), Romanian football center back
 Octavian Ionescu (footballer, born 1949), Romanian football midfielder
 Ștefan Octavian Iosif (1875–1913), Romanian poet and translator
 Octavian Nemescu (born 1940), Romanian composer
 Octavian Ormenișan (born 1992), Romanian footballer
 Octavian Paler (1926–2007), Romanian writer and activist
 Octavian Popescu (born 1938), Romanian footballer
 Octavian Popescu (born 1985), Romanian footballer
 Octavian Smigelschi (1866–1912), Austro-Hungarian Romanian painter
 Octavian Codru Tăslăuanu (1876-1942), Romanian magazine editor and politician
 Octavian Țîcu (born 1972), Moldovan politician
 Octavian Utalea (1868–?), Romanian politician
 Octavian Vintilă (born 1938), Romanian fencer
 Octavian Zidaru (born 1953), Romanian fencer
 Octavian, the Antipope Victor IV (1159–1164)

Romanian masculine given names